Amou Haji (20 August 1928 – 23 October 2022) was an Iranian man known for not bathing for more than 60 years.

Description 
Amou Haji was not his real name, but a nickname given to elderly people. He lived in a shack and a hole in the ground in the village of Dejgah, Fars. It was claimed that he had become a hermit after a heartbreak. He was celibate, ate meat from dead animals he found, drank water from puddles, smoked a pipe that had animal excrement on it and lived in a hole he had built himself. Despite his unhygienic lifestyle, he lived until the age of 94. He died shortly after washing for the first time in 60 years, having been persuaded by the inhabitants of Dejgah, in the southern province of Fars, to do so. He was photographed smoking several cigarettes at  a time. He refused water, food and basic necessities offered to him. These attempts to care for him even made him sad.

In 2014, he claimed that he had not washed himself for over 60 years. He believed that 'cleanliness brings on illness.'

Lifestyle 
 describes Haji as having a "face and beard caked in mustard brown earth" and that he "blends in" to the "barren landscape of southern Iran" and "that when he sits still he resembles a rock." His diet consisted of rotten porcupine carcasses and he smoked animal dung in his pipe. The latter is a treatment against infections according to Iranian traditional medicine.

To manage his hair he burned off the excess with a flame.

Death 
A few months before his death, the villagers of his village persuaded him to take a bath – fearing he would get sick if he ever used "soap and water," according to Iran's government-funded IRNA news agency, via AFP. In the report, Haji cited "emotional setbacks in his youth" as a primary reason for not bathing. After taking his first bath in 60 years, Haji fell ill and died a few months after bathing.

Documentary 

A 2013 documentary  is titled The Strange Life of Amou Haji.

See also
 Dirty Dick - a London merchant who refused to wash after his fiancée died on their wedding day

References

Sources

1928 births
2022 deaths
Iranian hermits
People from Fars Province